Arkhangel is a rural locality (a selo) in Butylitskoye Rural Settlement, Melenkovsky District, Vladimir Oblast, Russia. The population was 396 as of 2010. There are 5 streets.

Geography 
Arkhangel is located on the Unzha River, 16 km north of Melenki (the district's administrative centre) by road. Verkhounzha is the nearest rural locality.

References 

Rural localities in Melenkovsky District
Melenkovsky Uyezd